All Dulles Area Muslim Society (ADAMS) is one of the largest mosques in the United States, located in Sterling, VA and serving 5000 Muslim families. ADAMS offers a wide variety of services. Some are of religious nature such as Islamic and Arabic classes, while others are of communal nature such as Boy and Girl Scout activities.

The current Executive Director (for 25 years as of 2022) is Imam Mohamed Magid, a leading figure in the American Muslim community.

References

External links

Islamic organizations based in the United States
Mosques in Virginia